The beautiful rosefinch has been split into two species:

 Himalayan beautiful rosefinch (Carpodacus pulcherrimus)
 Chinese beautiful rosefinch (Carpodacus davidianus)